Mipus coriolisi is a species of sea snail, a marine gastropod mollusk in the family Muricidae, the murex snails or rock snails.

Description
The length of the shell attains 22.7 mm.

Distribution
This marine species occurs in the Coral Sea.

References

 Oliverio, M. (2008). Coralliophilinae (Neogastropoda: Muricidae) from the southwest Pacific. in: Héros, V. et al. (Ed.) Tropical Deep-Sea Benthos 25. Mémoires du Muséum national d'Histoire naturelle (1993). 196: 481-585

coriolisi
Gastropods described in 2004